Saltash Community School is a mixed 11 to 18 academy school established in its present form in 1965, in Saltash, Cornwall, England. The school was previously maintained by the Cornwall Education Authority before 1 April 2011, when the school became an academy. In 2013 it formed Saltash Multi Academy Regional Trust (SMART), together with Landulph Primary School. The school is situated in an Area of Outstanding Natural Beauty, and it occupies a  site overlooking Plymouth Sound and the Tamar and Lynher rivers.

Controversy
In 2019 an Ofsted report highlighted issues with leaders of the school. In addition to teachers failing to successfully assess pupils leading to slow progress. In November 2018 video footage appeared on social media which showed a schoolboy being assaulted by fellow Saltash students. The assault took place during non-school hours and at a park not connected with the school.

Multi Academy Trust
The school is currently part of Saltash Multi Academy Regional Trust, shortened to SMART, along with Landulph Primary School. In 2016, SMART indicated that it is currently in the process of adding more schools to the academy trust and plans to become the South East Cornwall Multi Academy Trust whilst retaining the SMART acronym. The plans currently name Dobwalls Primary School, Trewidland Primary School, Bodmin College, Looe Community Academy and Liskeard School and Community College.

References

External links

Secondary schools in Cornwall
Academies in Cornwall
Educational institutions established in 1965
1965 establishments in England